David Browning (born August 18, 1956) is a retired American football defensive end. He played in Super Bowl XV for the Oakland Raiders.

1956 births
Living people
Players of American football from Spokane, Washington
American football defensive ends
Washington Huskies football players
Oakland Raiders players
Los Angeles Raiders players
New England Patriots players